Henry Crist (October 20, 1764 – August 11, 1844) was a United States representative from Kentucky. He was born in Fredericksburg, Virginia. He moved with his father to Pennsylvania, where he attended the public schools. Later, moved to Kentucky and engaged in the surveying of lands. As early as 1779-80, Crist began coming down the Ohio River from Pennsylvania to as far as the Falls of the Ohio, at present day Louisville.  In 1788, he moved to Bullitt County, Kentucky and engaged in the manufacture of salt.

Crist was a member of the Kentucky House of Representatives in 1795 and 1806. He also served in the Kentucky Senate 1800–1804. He was elected as a Democratic-Republican to the Eleventh Congress (March 4, 1809 – March 3, 1811) and was later a Whig after the organization of that party. He died near Shepherdsville, Kentucky in 1844 and was buried there.  Later, the Kentucky Legislature had his remains moved to the Frankfort Cemetery, and erected a monument over his grave.

References

1764 births
1844 deaths
Burials at Frankfort Cemetery
Politicians from Fredericksburg, Virginia
Members of the Kentucky House of Representatives
Kentucky Whigs
18th-century American politicians
19th-century American politicians
Democratic-Republican Party members of the United States House of Representatives from Kentucky
Kentucky state senators
People from Bullitt County, Kentucky
Businesspeople from Kentucky